Magnetic confinement fusion is an approach to generate thermonuclear fusion power that uses magnetic fields to confine fusion fuel in the form of a plasma. Magnetic confinement is one of two major branches of fusion energy research, along with inertial confinement fusion. The magnetic approach began in the 1940s and absorbed the majority of subsequent development. 

Fusion reactions combine light atomic nuclei such as hydrogen to form heavier ones such as helium, producing energy. In order to overcome the electrostatic repulsion between the nuclei, they must have a temperature of tens of millions of degrees, creating a plasma. In addition, the plasma must be contained at a sufficient density for a sufficient time, as specified by the Lawson criterion (triple product).

Magnetic confinement fusion attempts to use the electrical conductivity of the plasma to contain it through interaction with magnetic fields. The magnetic pressure offsets the plasma pressure. Developing a suitable arrangement of fields that contain the fuel without excessive turbulence or leaking is the primary challenge of this technology.

History 
The development of magnetic fusion energy (MFE) came in three distinct phases. In the 1950s it was believed MFE would be relatively easy to achieve, setting off a race to build a suitable machine. By the late 1950s, it was clear that plasma turbulence and instabilities were problematic, and during the 1960s, "the doldrums", the effort turned to a better understanding of plasma physics. 

In 1968, a Soviet team invented the tokamak magnetic confinement device, which demonstrated performance ten times better than alternatives and became the preferred approach. 

Construction of a 500-MW power generating fusion plant using this design, the ITER, began in France in 2007. Its most recent schedule is for it to begin operation in 2025.

Plasma 
When fuel is injected into a fusion reactor, powerful "rogue" waves might be created that can cause it to escape confinement. These waves can reduce the efficiency or even stop the fusion reaction. Mathematical models can determine the likelihood of a rogue wave and can be used to calculate the exact angle of a counter-wave to cancel it out.

Magnetic islands are anomalies where magnetic field lines separate from the rest of the field and form a tube, allowing fuel to escape. The presence of large magnetic islands disrupt fusion. Injecting frozen pellets of deuterium into the fuel mixture can cause enough turbulence to disrupt the islands.

Types

Magnetic mirrors 

A major area of research in the early years of fusion energy research was the magnetic mirror. Most early mirror devices attempted to confine plasma near the focus of a non-planar magnetic field generated in a solenoid with the field strength increased at either end of the tube. In order to escape the confinement area, nuclei had to enter a small annular area near each magnet. It was known that nuclei would escape through this area, but by adding and heating fuel continually it was felt this could be overcome.

In 1954, Edward Teller gave a talk in which he outlined a theoretical problem that suggested the plasma would also quickly escape sideways through the confinement fields. This would occur in any machine with convex magnetic fields, which existed in the centre of the mirror area. Existing machines were having other problems and it was not obvious whether this was occurring. In 1961, a Soviet team conclusively demonstrated this flute instability was indeed occurring, and when a US team stated they were not seeing this issue, the Soviets examined their experiment and noted this was due to a simple instrumentation error.

The Soviet team also introduced a potential solution, in the form of "Ioffe bars". These bent the plasma into a new shape that was concave at all points, avoiding the problem Teller had pointed out. This demonstrated a clear improvement in confinement. A UK team then introduced a simpler arrangement of these magnets they called the "tennis ball", which was taken up in the US as the "baseball". Several baseball series machines were tested and showed much-improved performance. However, theoretical calculations showed that the maximum amount of energy they could produce would be about the same as the energy needed to run the magnets. As a power-producing machine, the mirror appeared to be a dead end.

In the 1970s, a solution was developed. By placing a baseball coil at either end of a large solenoid, the entire assembly could hold a much larger volume of plasma, and thus produce more energy. Plans began to build a large device of this "tandem mirror" design, which became the Mirror Fusion Test Facility (MFTF). Having never tried this layout before, a smaller machine, the Tandem Mirror Experiment (TMX) was built to test this layout. TMX demonstrated a new series of problems that suggested MFTF would not reach its performance goals, and during construction MFTF was modified to MFTF-B. However, due to budget cuts, one day after the construction of MFTF was completed it was mothballed. Mirrors have seen little development since that time.

Toroidal machines

Z-pinch
The first real effort to build a control fusion reactor used the pinch effect in a toroidal container. A large transformer wrapping the container was used to induce a current in the plasma inside. This current creates a magnetic field that squeezes the plasma into a thin ring, thus "pinching" it. The combination of Joule heating by the current and adiabatic heating as it pinches raises the temperature of the plasma to the required range in the tens of millions of degrees Kelvin.

First built in the UK in 1948, and followed by a series of increasingly large and powerful machines in the UK and US, all early machines proved subject to powerful instabilities in the plasma. Notable among them was the kink instability, which caused the pinched ring to thrash about and hit the walls of the container long before it reached the required temperatures. The concept was so simple, however, that herculean effort was expended to address these issues.

This led to the "stabilized pinch" concept, which added external magnets to "give the plasma a backbone" while it compressed. The largest such machine was the UK's ZETA reactor, completed in 1957, which appeared to successfully produce fusion. Only a few months after its public announcement in January 1958, these claims had to be retracted when it was discovered the neutrons being seen were created by new instabilities in the plasma mass. Further studies showed any such design would be beset with similar problems, and research using the z-pinch approach largely ended.

Stellarators

An early attempt to build a magnetic confinement system was the stellarator, introduced by Lyman Spitzer in 1951. Essentially the stellarator consists of a torus that has been cut in half and then attached back together with straight "crossover" sections to form a figure-8. This has the effect of propagating the nuclei from the inside to outside as it orbits the device, thereby cancelling out the drift across the axis, at least if the nuclei orbit fast enough.

Not long after the construction of the earliest figure-8 machines, it was noticed the same effect could be achieved in a completely circular arrangement by adding a second set of helically-wound magnets on either side. This arrangement generated a field that extended only part way into the plasma, which proved to have the significant advantage of adding "shear", which suppressed turbulence in the plasma. However, as larger devices were built on this model, it was seen that plasma was escaping from the system much more rapidly than expected, much more rapidly than could be replaced.

By the mid-1960s it appeared the stellarator approach was a dead end. In addition to the fuel loss problems, it was also calculated that a power-producing machine based on this system would be enormous, the better part of a thousand feet long. When the tokamak was introduced in 1968, interest in the stellarator vanished, and the latest design at Princeton University, the Model C, was eventually converted to the Symmetrical Tokamak.

Stellarators have seen renewed interest since the turn of the millennium as they avoid several problems subsequently found in the tokamak. Newer models have been built, but these remain about two generations behind the latest tokamak designs.

Tokamaks

In the late 1950s, Soviet researchers noticed that the kink instability would be strongly suppressed if the twists in the path were strong enough that a particle travelled around the circumference of the inside of the chamber more rapidly than around the chamber's length. This would require the pinch current to be reduced and the external stabilizing magnets to be made much stronger.

In 1968 Russian research on the toroidal tokamak was first presented in public, with results that far outstripped existing efforts from any competing design, magnetic or not. Since then the majority of effort in magnetic confinement has been based on the tokamak principle. In the tokamak a current is periodically driven through the plasma itself, creating a field "around" the torus that combines with the toroidal field to produce a winding field in some ways similar to that in a modern stellarator, at least in that nuclei move from the inside to the outside of the device as they flow around it.

In 1991, START was built at Culham, UK, as the first purpose-built spherical tokamak. This was essentially a spheromak with an inserted central rod. START produced impressive results, with β values at approximately 40% - three times that produced by standard tokamaks at the time. The concept has been scaled up to higher plasma currents and larger sizes, with the experiments NSTX (US), MAST (UK) and Globus-M (Russia) currently running. Spherical tokamaks have improved stability properties compared to conventional tokamaks and as such the area is receiving considerable experimental attention. However, spherical tokamaks to date have been at low toroidal field and as such are impractical for fusion neutron devices.

Compact toroids
Compact toroids, e.g. the spheromak and the Field-Reversed Configuration, attempt to combine the good confinement of closed magnetic surfaces configurations with the simplicity of machines without a central core. 
An early experiment of this type in the 1970s was Trisops. (Trisops fired two theta-pinch rings towards each other.)

Other 
Some more novel configurations produced in toroidal machines are the reversed field pinch and the Levitated Dipole Experiment.

The US Navy has also claimed a "Plasma Compression Fusion Device" capable of TW power levels in a 2018 US patent filing:

"It is a feature of the present invention to provide a plasma compression fusion device that can produce power in the gigawatt to terawatt range (and higher), with input power in the kilowatt to megawatt range." 

However, the patent has since been abandoned.

Magnetic fusion energy
All of these devices have faced considerable problems being scaled up and in their approach toward the Lawson criterion. One researcher has described the magnetic confinement problem in simple terms, likening it to squeezing a balloon – the air will always attempt to "pop out" somewhere else. Turbulence in the plasma has proven to be a major problem, causing the plasma to escape the confinement area, and potentially touch the walls of the container. If this happens, a process known as "sputtering", high-mass particles from the container (often steel and other metals) are mixed into the fusion fuel, lowering its temperature.

In 1997, scientists at the Joint European Torus (JET) facilities in the UK produced 16 megawatts of fusion power.  Scientists can now exercise a measure of control over plasma turbulence and resultant energy leakage, long considered an unavoidable and intractable feature of plasmas. There is increased optimism that the plasma pressure above which the plasma disassembles can now be made large enough to sustain a fusion reaction rate acceptable for a power plant. Electromagnetic waves can be injected and steered to manipulate the paths of plasma particles and then to produce the large electrical currents necessary to produce the magnetic fields to confine the plasma. These and other control capabilities have come from advances in basic understanding of plasma science in such areas as plasma turbulence, plasma macroscopic stability, and plasma wave propagation. Much of this
progress has been achieved with a particular emphasis on the tokamak.

Recent developments 

SPARC is a tokamak using deuterium–tritium (DT) fuel, currently being designed at the MIT Plasma Science and Fusion Center in collaboration with Commonwealth Fusion Systems with the goal of producing a practical reactor design in the near future. In late 2020, a special issue of the Journal of Plasma Physics was published including seven studies speaking to a high level of confidence in the efficacy of the reactor design focusing on using simulations to validate predictions for the operation and capacity of the reactor. One study focused on modeling the magnetohydrodynamic (MHD) conditions in the reactor. The stability of this condition will define the limits of plasma pressure that can be achieved under varying magnetic field pressures. 

The progress made with SPARC has built off previously mentioned work on the ITER project and is aiming to utilize new technology in high-temperature superconductors (HTS) as a more practical material. HTS will enable reactor magnets to produce greater magnetic field and proportionally increase the transport processes necessary to generate energy. One of the largest material considerations is ensuring the inner wall will be able to handle the intense amounts of heat that will be generated (expected to approach 10 GW per square meter in heat flux from the plasma. Not only does this material need to survive, but it needs to withstand damage enough to avoid contaminating the core plasma. Challenges such as this are being actively considered and accounted for in the models / predictive calculations used in the design process.

See also 
 Gas torus
 Magnetized Liner Inertial Fusion
 List of plasma (physics) articles

References

External links 
 EFDA-JET web site
 JET Image Gallery
 Culham Centre for Fusion Energy, CCFE 
 IAEA's information about JET
 Physics of magnetically confined plasmas
 General Atomics 
 Fusion Wiki (specialist information)